Rochester New York FC (RNY), formerly known as Rochester Raging Rhinos and Rochester Rhinos, is an American professional soccer club based in Rochester, New York that has been on hiatus since the end of the 2017 season, but will return to play in 2022 in MLS Next Pro, one of three leagues that form the third division in the United States. Founded in 1996, the club has competed at both the second and third tiers of American soccer. The following is a list of each season completed by RNY, inclusive of all competitive competitions.

Key
Key to competitions

 MLS Next Pro (MLSNP) – One of three leagues that form the third division of soccer in the United States, established in 2021 with play starting in 2022. MLSNP is operated by the top-level Major League Soccer (MLS) primarily as a home to reserve sides of its teams. RNY is the league's only founding member that is not an MLS reserve side.
 USL Championship (USLC) – The second division of soccer in the United States, established in 2010 and previously known as USL and USL Pro. The Championship was the third division of American soccer from its founding until its elevation to second division status in 2017.
 USSF Division 2 Professional League (D2 Pro) – The second division of soccer in the United States for a single season in 2010, now defunct.
 USL First Division (USL-1) – The second division of soccer in the United States from 2005 through 2009.
 A-League – The second division of soccer in the United States from 1995 through 2004, now defunct.
 U.S. Open Cup (USOC) – The premier knockout cup competition in US soccer, first contested in 1914.
 CONCACAF Champions League (CCL) – The premier competition in North American soccer since 1962. It went by the name of Champions' Cup until 2008.

Key to colors and symbols

Key to league record
 Season = The year and article of the season
 Div = Level on pyramid
 League = League name
 Pld = Played
 W = Games won
 L = Games lost
 D = Games drawn
 GF = Goals scored
 GA = Goals against
 Pts = Points
 PPG = Points per game
 Conf = Conference position
 Overall = League position

Key to cup record
 DNE = Did not enter
 DNQ = Did not qualify
 NH = Competition not held or canceled
 QR = Qualifying round
 PR = Preliminary round
 GS = Group stage
 R1 = First round
 R2 = Second round
 R3 = Third round
 R4 = Fourth round
 R5 = Fifth round
 QF = Quarterfinals
 SF = Semifinals
 RU = Runners-up
 W = Winners

Seasons 

1. Avg. attendance include statistics from league matches only.
2. Top goalscorer(s) includes all goals scored in league play, playoffs, U.S. Open Cup, and other competitive matches.
3. Points and PPG have been adjusted from non-traditional to traditional scoring systems for seasons prior to 2003 to more effectively compare historical team performance across seasons.
4. Pts in 2008 excludes one deducted point for fielding an ineligible player.

References

External links

Seasons
 
Rochester Rhinos
Rochester New York FC seasons